"The Cremation of Sam McGee" is among the most famous of Robert W. Service's (1874–1958) poems. It was published in 1907 in Songs of a Sourdough. (A "sourdough", in this sense, is a resident of the Yukon.) It concerns the cremation of a prospector who freezes to death near Lake Laberge (spelled "Lebarge" by Service), Yukon, Canada, as told by the man who cremates him.

Poem
The night prior to his death the title character, who is from the fictional town of Plumtree, Tennessee, asks the narrator "to swear that, foul or fair, you'll cremate my last remains".  The narrator knows that "A pal's last need is a thing to heed", and swears he will not fail to cremate him. After McGee dies the following day, the narrator winds up hauling the body clear to the "marge [shore, edge] of Lake Lebarge" before he finds a way to perform the promised cremation aboard a derelict steamer called the Alice May. Much to the narrator's surprise, he later discovers Sam's ghost in the makeshift crematorium, enjoying the warmth. Another interpretation has Sam McGee still alive and enjoying the warmth of the furnace fire in the style of a "Tall Tale."  Sam has conned the narrator into trekking him to a warm location through the ruse of promising to have him cremated. 

Robert Service based the poem on an experience of his roommate, Dr. Leonard S. E. Sugden, who had cremated a corpse in the firebox of the steamer Olive May.

A success upon its initial publication in 1907, the poem became a staple of traditional campfire storytelling in North America throughout the 20th century. An edition of the poem, published in 1986 and illustrated by Ted Harrison, is read widely in Canadian elementary schools.

Reality behind the fiction
Although the poem was fiction, it was based on people and things that Robert Service actually saw in the Yukon. Lake Laberge is formed by a widening of the Yukon River just north of Whitehorse and is still in use by kayakers. The Alice May was based on the derelict stern-wheeler the Olive May that belonged to the Bennett Lake & Klondike Navigation Co. and had originally been named for the wife and daughter of Albert Sperry Kerry Sr.  It was abandoned after it struck a rock near Tagish, which is about 50 kilometres south of Lake Laberge.  Dr. Sugden used its firebox to cremate the body of Cornelius Curtin (who had died of pneumonia). The remains were then shipped to his family for burial.  (Although a boat named Alice May sank on Lake Laberge, that happened a decade after the publication of the poem.)

William Samuel McGee (b 1868, Lindsay, Ontario, - d 1940, Beiseker, Alberta) was primarily a road builder but did indulge in some prospecting. Like others, McGee was in San Francisco, California, at the time of the Klondike Gold Rush and in 1898 left for the Klondike.

In 1904, Service, who was working in the Canadian Bank of Commerce (the predecessor of the Canadian Imperial Bank of Commerce) branch in Whitehorse, saw McGee's name on a form and used it in his poem as it was a rhyme for "Tennessee".

In 1909 McGee traveled south of the Yukon to build roads, including some in Yellowstone National Park. Eventually, McGee and his wife moved to live with their daughter outside of Beiseker. However, in 1930 McGee returned to the Yukon to try prospecting along the Liard River, but met with no success. He did however return with an urn that he had purchased in Whitehorse. The urns, said to contain the ashes of Sam McGee, were being sold to visitors.

McGee spent the rest of his life at his daughter's farm where he died in 1940 of a heart attack.

Today
On 17 August 1976, Canada Post issued "Robert W. Service, Sam McGee" as an 8¢ stamp designed by David Charles Bierk.

In 1995, Canadian band Weeping Tile (Sarah Harmer) released Eepee, featuring the song “Westray”, borrowing lines from The Cremation of Sam McGee, with slight changes to the lyrics written to reference the Westray mine disaster. Coal replaces gold in this version of the tale.

Johnny Cash's reading of the poem was National Public Radio's song of the day on May 9, 2006. Cash's "The Cremation of Sam McGee" was released along with a vast collection of personal archive recordings of Johnny Cash on the two-disc album Personal File.

Canadian folksinger/songwriter Stompin' Tom Connors created an uptempo song summarizing the tale in the early 1970s on his album Stompin' Tom Meets Big Joe Mufferaw.

The poem was anthologized in the Oxford Book of Narrative Verse (1983).

The NFB (National Film Board of Canada) released an animated film in 1990 of the poem, read by Max Ferguson and using Ted Harrison's illustrations.

In 2022, musician Seth Boyer adapted the poem into a bluegrass song for use in the video essay Fear of Cold by Jacob Geller.

Notes

References

External links
 Sam McGee's Cabin
 Yukon Archives showing the Olive May
 Text of the poem

Canadian poems
1907 poems
Klondike Gold Rush in fiction
Works by Robert W. Service